Flax micronesia is a moth of the family Erebidae first described by Michael Fibiger in 2011. It is found in Micronesia (it was described from Babelthuap Island in Palau).

The wingspan is about 10 mm. The labial palps, head, patagia, tegulae, thorax and the ground colour of the forewings (including fringes) are beige, with a brown medial area. The subterminal and terminal areas of the forewing have light-brown areas. The base of the costa is brown. There is a brown quadrangular patch in the upper medial area, with a black dot in the inner lower area. The crosslines are indistinct and the terminal line is only indicated by dark-brown interveinal dots. The hindwings are light grey with an indistinct discal spot. The underside of the forewings is unicolorous light brown and the underside of the hindwings is grey with a discal spot.

References

Micronoctuini
Moths described in 2011
Taxa named by Michael Fibiger